Ebru Timtik (1978 – August 27, 2020) was a Kurdish-Turkish human rights lawyer who died after going on hunger strike in pursuit of a fair trial. She was one of a group of 18 lawyers known for representing clients critical of the Turkish government, who were arrested in September 2017.

Biography
Timtik was part of a group of 18 lawyers arrested in September 2017. They were all members of either the Progressive Lawyers Association (ÇHD) or the People’s Law Bureau, known for representing clients critical of the Turkish government. These included cases such as the miners who died due to government failings in the Soma mine disaster, Berkin Elvan, Engin Çeber, and Dilek Dogan. In March 2019, they were found guilty of membership or association with the outlawed Revolutionary People's Liberation Party/Front (DHKP-C) and sentenced to lengthy prison terms. Timtik was sentenced to 13 years and 6 months in prison and Aytaç Ünsal to 10 years and 6 months. Milena Buyum, Amnesty International's senior campaign manager on Turkey called the convictions "a travesty of justice and demonstrate yet again the inability of courts crippled under political pressure to deliver a fair trial." She called for the lawyers to be unconditionally released and for the convictions to be quashed. In October, Timtik's appeal to the Istanbul Regional Court of Appeal was rejected and at the time of her death, her appeal to the Turkish Supreme Court was pending.

Hunger strike 

On January 2, 2020, Timtik initiated a hunger-strike to fight for her right to have a fair trial and Ünsal joined her on February 2. On April 5, Timtik and Ünsal declared that they would go through with their fasting until their deaths. On June 1, the International Association of Democratic Lawyers submitted a petition signed by 365 foreign and 400 Turkish lawyers to the Supreme Court urging it to acquit the imprisoned lawyers. In the early hours of July 30, Timtik and Ünsal were taken from the high-security Silivri Prison to separate hospitals in Istanbul. On August 12, 2020, the European Association of Lawyers for Democracy and World Human Rights sent an open letter addressed to the United Nations, expressing their grave concern about the hunger-striking lawyers. Her cousin who visited her in the hospital said she was pressured into breaking her fast: "They are constantly manoeuvring to break her will. They're using every pretext." After 238 days of fasting Timtik died on August 27, 2020, weighing only 30 kg. She became the fourth Turkish prisoner to die on a hunger strike in 2020, following the deaths of Helin Bölek, İbrahim Gökçek, and Mustafa Koçak earlier this year.

Aftermath 
Deutsche Welle reported the Turkish police impeded the participation at the burial ceremony in the cemetery by her supporters, countering them with armored vehicles, a helicopter and teargas.

Reactions to her death 
News of Timtik's death was met with condemnations of the Turkish judiciary: 
 Turkish politician Nesrin Nas wrote on her Twitter: "I am so sorry. She just wanted a fair trial. A state that turns a deaf ear to its citizens’ demand to a fair trial…Where are we running to?"
 Turkish musician Zülfü Livaneli wrote on his Twitter that her death was the "death of humanity, justice and conscience" in Turkey.
 Turkish opposition politician Sezgin Tanrıkulu in an interview slammed the decision not to release her: "Shame on those who did not give a decision for release. We had begged the Court of Cassation [Supreme Court] to handle this file."
 European Democratic Lawyers tweeted: "We, from all over the world, tried our best, but as a result of injustice, the dysfunctional judicial system of Turkey, we could not get her from their hands."
 The Council of Europe's Commissioner for Human Rights Dunja Mijatović stated: "Ms Timtik’s death is a tragic illustration of the human suffering caused by a judicial system in Turkey that has turned into a tool to silence lawyers, human rights defenders and journalists, through systematic disregard for the most basic principles of the rule of law."
 A statement from the European External Action Service read: "The tragic outcome of their fight for a fair trial painfully illustrates the urgent need for the Turkish authorities to credibly address the human rights situation in the country, which has severely deteriorated in recent years, as well as serious shortcomings observed in the judiciary."

Award 
The Council of Bars and Law Societies of Europe (CCBE) bestowed Ebru Timtik posthumously with a Human Rights Award in 2020.

References

External links
 A statement by People’s Law Bureau-International Office regarding the martyrdom of lawyer Ebru Timtik, New Solution Magazine

1978 births
2020 deaths
21st-century Kurdish people
21st-century women lawyers
People who died on hunger strike
Place of birth missing
Human rights lawyers
Turkish women lawyers
21st-century Turkish lawyers
Turkish Kurdish women 
Turkish communists
Turkish Marxists
Turkish socialists
Revolutionary People's Liberation Party/Front politicians